The South African Athletics Championships is an annual outdoor track and field competition organised by the Athletics South Africa, which serves as the national championship for the sport in South Africa.

Typically organised in March or April at the end of the South African summer, the event was first held in 1894 and introduced the first events for women in 1929. Separate annual championship events are held for cross country running, road running and racewalking events. The championships was first initiated by European colonists in the Cape Colony and continued with the formation of the Union of South Africa in 1910. The competition was organised and attended only by White South Africans (mostly of Dutch and British heritage). An open championship was established in 1974, including all races and international athletes. The International Amateur Athletic Association (IAAF) banned South Africa from international athletics in 1976 for its apartheid policy. As a result, the two competitions merged to form a single multi-racial national championship in 1977.

Events
The competition programme features a total of 38 individual South African Championship athletics events, 19 for men and 19 for women. For each of the sexes, there are seven track running events, three obstacle events, four jumps, four throws, and one combined track and field event. There are also two relay team events which are contested between clubs, mostly of a provincial nature. Events were measured in imperial units until a change to the international metric standard in 1968.

Track running
100 metres, 200 metres, 400 metres, 800 metres, 1500 metres, 5000 metres, 10,000 metres
Obstacle events
100 metres hurdles (women only), 110 metres hurdles (men only), 400 metres hurdles, 3000 metres steeplechase
Jumping events
Pole vault, high jump, long jump, triple jump
Throwing events
Shot put, discus throw, javelin throw, hammer throw
Combined events
Decathlon (men only), Heptathlon (women only)
Relay
4 × 100 metres relay, 4 × 400 metres relay

A men's 220-yard hurdles was held previously but dropped after 1966. Track racewalking was previously held at the competition, but was abolished after 1975 for men and held only for women in the period from 1991–1993.

The women's programme gradually expanded to match the men's. On the track, the 440-yard dash was first held in 1967, 1500 m was added in 1970, the 3000 metres in 1973 and the 10,000 metres in 1989. The 3000 m was replaced by a 5000 m in 1995. The 80 metres hurdles was contested until 1969, after which the international standard distance of 100 m hurdles was used. A 200 m hurdles event was introduced in 1972, then replaced by the longer 400 m event in 1975. Similarly, the women's pentathlon was replaced by the heptathlon in 1981. The women's field events reached parity with the men's after the addition of triple jump in 1991, hammer throw in 1994, and pole vault in 1995. The women's steeplechase was the last event to be added to the programme, appearing in 2000 metres steeplechase format in 1999 then being held over the standard 3000 m distance from the 2000 championships onwards.

Editions

References

 
Athletics competitions in South Africa
National athletics competitions
Recurring sporting events established in 1894
1894 establishments in the Cape Colony
Athletics